Can't Stop is the fifth Korean extended play (ninth overall) by the South Korean rock band CNBLUE. It was released on February 24, 2014, with the track "Can't Stop" as the promotional single. This mini album marked a change in CNBLUE's music. Its lead singer, Jung Yong-hwa, ditched the guitar and played piano on most of the songs. The style of this album is, as its lead singer said in an interview, a bit of Brit rock meets melodic pop rock and even Latin melodies that can be heard in "Diamond Girl".

Reception
In December, 2014, Billboard K-Town included the EP on its list of "The 10 Best K-Pop Albums of 2014" at #9, calling the tracks "Can't Stop" and "Like a Child" "some of the most accessible Korean rock tunes to come out of the scene this year", and "Cold Love" a "gritty ballad" and "Diamond Girl" a feisty rock jam.

Track listing

Album sales

Release history

References

External links
 

2014 EPs
CNBLUE EPs
Korean-language EPs
FNC Entertainment EPs